The LM-700 is a satellite bus which was built by Lockheed Martin between the mid-1990s and early 2000s. Typically used for low Earth orbit communications satellites, ninety nine were built, all but one for Iridium Satellite LLC. The exception was a technology development satellite for the United States Air Force, which was never launched. In addition, two boilerplate satellites were launched on a test flight of the Chinese Long March 2C rocket.

Overview
Two variants of the LM-700 were built. The ninety eight Iridium satellites used the LM-700A configuration, specialised for communications. Of these ninety five were launched, whilst three were retained as spares. One of the spare satellites is now displayed in the US National Air and Space Museum.

The LM-700B, designed for other missions, was also offered. One was built as the SBIRS-LADS demonstration satellite for the US Air Force's Space Based Infrared System, however its launch was cancelled after the satellite had been completed and delivered to the customer.

The LM-700A Iridium satellites were launched in clusters between 1997 and 2002. Satellites were launched in groups of five on Delta II 7920-10C rockets, groups of seven on Proton-K/DM2 rockets, pairs on the Long March 2C and on the last launch, two satellites on a Rockot. The cancelled SBIRS-LADS satellite would have used an Athena II.

An LM-700A, Iridium 33 was one of the satellites destroyed in the 2009 satellite collision. Most of the Iridium satellites currently in orbit have already exceeded their design life, whilst others are approaching the end of it, however at least enough satellites are still operating to maintain the network, which requires sixty six.

Satellites

See also
Orbcomm (satellite)

References

Satellite buses